Mía Gayle Asenjo (born 7 March 2003) is an American-raised Dominican footballer who plays as a left winger for college team UCF Knights and the Dominican Republic women's national team.

Early life
Asenjo was raised in Malverne, New York.

College career
On 20 November 2020, Asenjo committed to the University of Central Florida in Orlando, Florida.

International career
Asenjo represented the Dominican Republic at the 2020 CONCACAF Women's U-20 Championship. She made her senior debut on 18 February 2021 in a friendly home match against Puerto Rico.

International goals
Scores and results list Dominican Republic's goal tally first

References

2003 births
Living people
Dominican Republic women's footballers
Women's association football wingers
Dominican Republic women's international footballers
People from Malverne, New York
Sportspeople from Nassau County, New York
Soccer players from New York (state)
American women's soccer players
UCF Knights women's soccer players
American sportspeople of Dominican Republic descent
African-American women's soccer players
21st-century African-American sportspeople
21st-century African-American women